Scirpophaga occidentella is a moth in the family Crambidae. It was described by Francis Walker in 1863. It is found in Angola, the Democratic Republic of the Congo, Ivory Coast, Madagascar, Malawi, Mozambique, Nigeria, Senegal, Sierra Leone, South Africa and Tanzania.

The wingspan is 16–22 mm for males and 20–30 mm for females. The forewings and hindwings are white. Females have a pale ochreous white anal tuft.

The larvae feed on Oryza sativa.

References

Moths described in 1863
Schoenobiinae
Moths of Africa